Deborah Adler (born 1975) is an American designer.

A native of Chappaqua, New York, Adler is the daughter of a doctor and a nurse. She attended the University of Vermont, receiving her BFA in 1997. Adler then studied design at the School of Visual Arts under Steven Heller and Lita Talarico. During this time, her grandmother became ill, having accidentally taken her husband's medication through inability to distinguish what was in the package. This led Adler to redesign prescription bottles as a thesis project. The resulting creation, ClearRx, was distributed nationally by Target Corporation in its stores, and was a success. An example of the ClearRx bottle is in the permanent collection of the Museum of Modern Art. Adler completed her MFA in 2002. She served as senior designer for Milton Glaser for five years, and has since opened a boutique design firm in West Chelsea, Manhattan. A mother of two, she has served on the national board of directors of the American Institute of Graphic Arts and on the steering committee of the organization's Women Lead Initiative, and has shown at the National Design Triennial at the Cooper Hewitt.

References

1975 births
Living people
American graphic designers
Women graphic designers
People from Chappaqua, New York
Artists from New York (state)
21st-century American artists
21st-century American women artists
University of Vermont alumni
School of Visual Arts alumni